"Phat Planet" is a song by the English electronic group Leftfield, taken from their album Rhythm and Stealth, released in 1999. It is built on an insistent, two-note bassline, and the heavily distorted vocal of "Phat Planet", spoken by Neil Barnes. It was not released as a single, but was used on the "Surfer" advert for Guinness.

Appearances and other releases
 An early version of "Phat Planet" soundtracks the "Surfer" advert for Guinness. The bassline used in the advert later evolved into "Phat Planet". 
 It featured in the soundtrack of EA Sports F1 2000.
 The song was also used as the theme tune to the Transformers series Beast Machines. 
 In addition to its release on Rhythm and Stealth, the song is also included on the 2010 Sony Music Entertainment UK compilation Epic and the Guinness 250th Anniversary: the TV Ads album, where an edited version is found on the said album.
 German dance act Bass Bumpers had a UK hit single in 2006 with a mash-up of "Phat Planet" and the Baywatch theme tune. This new version was entitled "Phat Beach (I'll Be Ready)" (with the group being credited as Naughty Boy on this Ministry Of Sound release) and got to Number 36 in the UK Single Chart.

References

Leftfield songs
1999 songs
English electronic songs